Hafeez Ahmed Khan (died 2006) was an Indian classical musician of Hindustani classical music. He is known as one of the leading exponents of the Rampur-Sahaswan gharana, a musical school popular in the northern parts of the Indian state of Uttar Pradesh. He learnt music in gurukul system and pursued his academic studies the conventional way, secured a master's degree in politics and taught at the University of Minnesota. He was a deputy director of the All India Radio and the vice chancellor of the Indira Kala Sangeet University, the only Indian university dedicated to music. He mentored many disciples such as Rajendra Prasanna, Roma Rani Bhattacharya, Sakuntala Narasimhan and Subhendu Ghosh and acted in a German movie on the life of Tansen, by name, The Rain Maker. He was a recipient of the 1996 Sangeet Natak Akademi Award. The Government of India awarded her the fourth highest civilian honour of the Padma Shri in 1991. Hafeez Ahmed Khan, who was married to the daughter of renowned singer, Nissar Hussain Khan, died in 2006.

See also 

 Rampur-Sahaswan gharana
 Rajendra Prasanna
 Indira Kala Sangeet University
 Nissar Hussain Khan

References

External links 
 
 

Recipients of the Padma Shri in arts
2006 deaths
Indian male classical musicians
Hindustani singers
Recipients of the Sangeet Natak Akademi Award
University of Minnesota faculty
All India Radio people
Heads of universities and colleges in India
Year of birth missing
20th-century Indian singers
20th-century Indian male singers